Proctogastrolaelaps is a genus of mites in the family Ascidae.

Species
 Proctogastrolaelaps libris McGraw & Farrier, 1969

References

Ascidae